Pål Rock is a rock lying between Per and Oskeladden Rocks in the Arkticheskiy Institut Rocks at the northwest extremity of the Wohlthat Mountains, Queen Maud Land. It was discovered and photographed by the German Antarctic Expedition, 1938–39, and mapped by Norway from air photos and surveys by Norwegian Antarctic Expedition, 1956–60, and named Pål (Paul).

References

Rock formations of Queen Maud Land
Princess Astrid Coast